is a Japanese actress and former gravure idol. She is known for her role as Ahim de Famille/Gokai Pink in the 2011 Super Sentai series Kaizoku Sentai Gokaiger. She was a member of the idol group Tomato n'Pine. She is currently affiliated with Weeds Company.

Filmography

TV series

Films

References

External links
Official agency profile 

1991 births
Living people
Actors from Saitama Prefecture
21st-century Japanese actresses
Japanese gravure idols